Pırnar is a village in the Keşan District of Edirne Province in Turkey.

References

Villages in Keşan District